Mengen is a rural town in Bolu Province in the Black Sea region of western Turkey,  from the provincial center city of Bolu. It is the seat of Mengen District. Its population is 5,585 (2021). The mayor is Turhan Bulut (CHP).

Mengen is famous for its cooks and its annual cookery festival; chefs trained in Mengen can be found in the best hotels all over Turkey. The town is along the historical travel route between the large cities of Istanbul and Ankara, and a popular lodging destination for travelers between the cities. The cookery school in Mengen has traditionally trained chefs for the Turkish president in Ankara and other high government officials.

Mengen is a forested district and the largest plain in the mountainous area surrounding it, where the traditional lifestyle has persisted. It is one of the few places in Turkey where the tradition of the köçek (male belly dancers) at village weddings remains widespread. The köçek also perform at the food festival in August.

Hunting is a popular visitor sport in the district. In the summer, walking trails in the high country above the town become popular.

The town prominently advertises its cookery tradition; it dons many billboards and statues of smiling chefs throughout the district. Dinner in Mengen is typically grilled meats and pilav rice served with lashings of Turkish rakı, the traditional aniseed beverage. However, although Mengen trains and exports chefs to Turkey as a whole, there are not that many restaurants in the small town itself.

References

External links and references 
 

Populated places in Bolu Province
Towns in Turkey
Mengen District